Woodlawn Cemetery is a publicly-owned cemetery in Westbrook, Maine, U.S. It was established in 1885. In 1933-34, Woodlawn was significantly improved by a make-work project by the Civil Works Administration. Three miles of avenues were given a coat of gravel among other improvements. It is the only cemetery in the city which offers winter burials.

Notable interments
 Alexander Speirs (1859–1927), state legislator

References

External links
 

Buildings and structures in Westbrook, Maine
Cemeteries in Cumberland County, Maine
1885 establishments in Maine